Dorian Alexander Boose (January 29, 1974 – November 22, 2016) was an American football defensive end in the National Football League for the New York Jets and the Washington Redskins.  He played college football at Washington State University and was drafted in the second round of the 1998 NFL Draft.  He played two seasons for the Canadian Football League with the Edmonton Eskimos in 2003 and 2004.  He committed suicide on November 22, 2016 in Edmonton, Alberta.

References

1974 births
2016 deaths
2016 suicides
American football defensive ends
Edmonton Elks players
New York Jets players
Washington Redskins players
Sportspeople from Frankfurt
German players of American football
Suicides in Alberta
German players of Canadian football